Anne Cromwell's Virginal Book is a manuscript keyboard compilation dated 1638. Whilst the importance of the music it contains is not high, it reveals the sort of keyboard music that was being played in the home at this time.

The manuscript

The upright quarto book originally contained 51 pages, five of which have been torn out. It retains its original calf binding with gold tooling, and the initials A.C. are stamped on both back and front covers. The verso of the title page bears a table of note values and four lines of verse:

Each of the following 33 pages bears eight sets of six-line ruled staves on which are fifty short pieces of music, written in at least two hands. The remaining pages are blank apart from the last, on the verso of which is written:

This Book was my Grandmothers Ann Daughter and Coheiresse of Henry Cromwell Esqr. of Upwood in Count. Huntingdon & was dated 1638 But somebody has torn out þe [the] Leaf.

The book is currently in Museum of London

The author

Anne Cromwell was born in 1618, the youngest child of Henry Cromwell († 1630) of Upwood, now in Cambridgeshire. Henry was the brother of Robert Cromwell (c. 1570-1617), the father of Oliver Cromwell, making Ann a first cousin of the Lord Protector. Anne later married John Neale of Dean, Bedfordshire. Her Coheiresse (above) was her sister Elizabeth Cromwell (born 1616) who with Anne may have had a hand in the writing of the manuscript.

Contents

The pieces contained in the manuscript are relatively simple, and written for the amateur performer. Most are anonymous, and consist of songs, dances, psalms and symphonies (masque music). Only nine pieces are attributed, of which six are to Simon Ives (1600-1662), one to John Ward, one to Bulstrode Whitelocke and one to (possibly) Thomas Holmes († 1638). However composers of some of the other pieces can be identified from other sources, and include John Bull, John Dowland and Henry Lawes. The contents (maintaining the original spelling) are as follows:

A Preludium (John Bull)
A Psalme
Mrs Villers Sport:
Besse A Bell
Daphny
The Building of Polles
The French Balletto
A French Tuckato
Fortune my foe
In the dayes of old
Frogges Galliard (John Dowland)
 [untitled]
Mr Wards Masque (? John Ward)
The Princes Masque
A Toy
The Queens Masque
The New Nightingall
The Meiry Companion
An Ayre
The Meiry Milke-maide
Simphony
The Queenes Galiard
Simphony
Simphony
A Corranto
A Masque
The Meiry old man:
The Healthes
The Sheepeard
The Duke of Buckeinghams Masque
The Milke maide
The 
Symphony
The Choyce by Mr Ives (Simon Ives)
[untitled]
Mr W: M: delight (Simon Ives)
The Scotch tune
The Blaseing Torch
Mr Holmes Coranto (? Thomas Holmes)
[untitled]
Mr Whitelockes Coranto (Bulstrode Whitelocke)
Simphony by Mr Ives (Simon Ives)
Among the Mirtills (Henry Lawes)
[untitled]
An almon by Mr Ive (Simon Ives)
A Coranto by Mr Ive (Simon Ives)
 A Coranto by Mr Ive (Simon Ives)
The Maide
A Simphony by Mr Ive (Simon Ives)
al done

See also

 The Mulliner Book
 The Dublin Virginal Manuscript
 My Ladye Nevells Booke
 Susanne van Soldt Manuscript
 Clement Matchett's Virginal Book
 Fitzwilliam Virginal Book
 Parthenia
 Priscilla Bunbury's Virginal Book
 Elizabeth Rogers' Virginal Book

Further reading
 Anne Cromwell's Virginal Book, 1638. Transcribed and edited by Howard Ferguson. Oxford University Press, 1974. 

Renaissance music
Books on English music
Compositions for harpsichord
Compositions for keyboard
Renaissance music manuscript sources
1638 compositions
1638 books